"The Dream of a Soldier Boy" is a World War I song written by Al Dubin and composed by James V. Monaco. It was published in 1917 by Witmark & Sons in New York City. The sheet music cover depicts a photo of a soldier embracing his mother while a proud father and others look on.

The sheet music can be found at the Pritzker Military Museum & Library.

References

Bibliography
Jasen, David A. Tin Pan Alley: The Composers, the Songs, the Performers, and Their Times : the Golden Age of American Popular Music from 1886 to 1956. New York: D.I. Fine, 1988. . 
Parker, Bernard S. World War I Sheet Music 1. Jefferson: McFarland & Company, Inc., 2007. . 
Vogel, Frederick G. World War I Songs: A History and Dictionary of Popular American Patriotic Tunes, with Over 300 Complete Lyrics. Jefferson: McFarland & Company, Inc., 1995. .

External links
The Dream of A Soldier Boy available from University of Maine Digital Commons, Vocal Popular Music Collection

Songs about dreams
Songs about soldiers
1917 songs
Songs of World War I
Songs with lyrics by Al Dubin
Songs with music by James V. Monaco